Washington's 5th legislative district is one of forty-nine districts in Washington state for representation in the state legislature. The district borders Kittitas County on the east; the 31st legislative district on the south; parts of Maple Valley, Renton, and Issaquah on the west; and Snohomish County on the north.

The largely rural district is represented by state senator Mark Mullet and state representatives Bill Ramos (position 1) and Lisa Callan (position 2), all Democrats.

See also
Washington State Redistricting Commission
Washington State Legislature
Washington State Senate
Washington House of Representatives

References

External links
Washington State Redistricting Commission
Washington House of Representatives
Map of Legislative Districts

05